Roy Dale Washburn (born December 13, 1950) is an American politician from Georgia.

Career 
Washburn is a Republican member of Georgia House of Representatives for District 141.

Personal life 
Washburn's wife is Donna Washburn. They have four children.

References

Republican Party members of the Georgia House of Representatives
21st-century American politicians
Living people
1950 births